Seyyed Mansour Razavi is an Iranian engineer and politician. He served as a Tehran councilman and the vice president in charge of public service.

Razavi is regarded a right-wing technocrat close to Rafsanjani.

Electoral history

References 

 Biography

1952 births
Living people
Islamic Republican Party politicians
Executives of Construction Party politicians
Candidates in the 2001 Iranian presidential election
Politicians from Isfahan
Vice presidents of Iran
Tehran Councillors 1999–2003
Presidential advisers of Iran
Iranian engineers